Schönberg is a mountain in Liechtenstein in the Rätikon range of the Eastern Alps north-east of the village of Steg, with a height of .

References
 
 

Mountains of the Alps
Mountains of Liechtenstein